The 2014 Grand Prix SAR La Princesse Lalla Meryem was a professional women's tennis tournament played on clay courts. It was the 14th edition of the tournament which was part of the WTA International tournaments category of the 2014 WTA Tour. It took place at the Royal Tennis Club de Marrakech in Marrakesh, Morocco, between 21 and 27 April 2014.

Points and prize money

Point distribution

Prize money

Singles main draw entrants

Seeds 

 1 Rankings as of 14 April 2014

Other entrants 
The following players received wildcards into the singles main draw:
  Rita Atik
  Daniela Hantuchová
  Ons Jabeur

The following players received entry as qualifiers:
  Lara Arruabarrena
  Beatriz García Vidagany
  Renata Voráčová
  Maryna Zanevska

The following player received entry as a lucky loser:
  Anastasia Grymalska

Withdrawals 
Before the tournament
  Alexandra Dulgheru (right knee injury) → replaced by Anastasia Grymalska
  Alison Riske  → replaced by Petra Martić
  Laura Robson  → replaced by Estrella Cabeza Candela
  Barbora Záhlavová-Strýcová → replaced by Romina Oprandi
  Vera Zvonareva → replaced by Alison Van Uytvanck

During the tournament
  Peng Shuai (left thigh injury)

Doubles main draw entrants

Seeds 

 1 Rankings as of 14 April 2014

Other entrants 
The following pairs received wildcards into the doubles main draw:
  Rita Atik /  Lina Qostal
  Ghita Benhadi /  Zaineb El Houari

Withdrawals 
During the tournament
  Chanelle Scheepers (right knee injury)

Champions

Singles 

  María Teresa Torró Flor def.  Romina Oprandi 6–3, 3–6, 6–3

Doubles 

  Garbiñe Muguruza /  Romina Oprandi def.  Katarzyna Piter /  Maryna Zanevska, 4–6, 6–2, [11–9]

References

External links 
 Official website

Grand Prix SAR La Princesse Lalla Meryem
Morocco Open
2014 in Moroccan tennis